Melinda Crane-Röhrs (born November 18, 1956) is an American journalist, political commentator, publicist and television host who has lived in Germany since 1985.

References

1956 births
Living people
People from Boston
American emigrants to Germany
American television hosts
American television journalists
American women television journalists
American women television presenters